EOY Cosplay Festival, also known as the "End of Year" Cosplay Festival, is a Japanese pop-cultural arts event that is non-profit and fan-run multigenre convention featuring anime, cosplay, doujin works, subculture fashion and Japanese pop music held in Singapore. Since 2012, it has become a free public event until 2018.

Its highlights include the hundreds of cosplayers who visit each year, generous opportunities for cosplay photography, guest performances by Japanese celebrities, music and dance performances by home-grown talents, artwork exhibitions and booths selling anime merchandise and personal artworks.

Alongside the annual events, EOY also partners related organisations to hold periodic events and performances related to anime, cosplay and music. Notable ones include the Singapore Silver Cosplay Club cosplay competition, Walk for Our Children (Singapore Children’s Society), TAO “Art of Drum”, Liang Court Anime Week, Bon Japan Theme Cafes, SGCafe Maid and Butler Cafe and Marie Digby's Your Love Asia Tour.

History 
EOY was first organized by Miyuki Animation Club (MAC). MAC was a then-club under Fengshan Community Centre. The Shiro Tsubasa Anime Club took over the management of the event until 2008. 

From 2009, EOY has been run by EOY LLP.

In 2012, EOY made a shift from the typical paid indoor convention model to a public festival in the open that was free. EOY Cosplay Festival 2012 was held in Marina Barrage and attained a huge jump in attendance from 4000 in 2011 to over 10,000 in 2012. In 2013, the attendance was doubled to 20,000.

Mascot 

Kyouyaku Yume is a blue-haired girl with no recollection of her identity and past. With a vaguely written clue and a turquoise pebble which she found on herself when she awoke, she goes on a journey of self-discovery.

Yume is specially created by Daiyaku, a Singapore-based art group, for EOY. She is a representation of how the artists believe that people can discover their identity, talents and purpose in life through meeting people and courage to experience new things.

Activities 
Aside from stage performances and cosplay photography, the festival also features other fringe activities, depending on participating sponsors and exhibitors.

Activities featured in recent years:

 Each year, EOY holds auditions for locally based singers, dancers and musicians who wish to get stage time at EOY. Popular types of music used in these performances include anime theme songs and Japanese pop. The performances run from afternoon to evening.

 Doki Doki Hearts Cafe: In 2012, EOY organised its very own Cosplay Cafe. The staff, clad in costumes of their favourite characters, were selected through auditions, and were made to undergo training. At the cafe, they serve desserts to customers while staying in character of whoever they’re cosplaying. Cafe guests were treated to desserts from local Japanese-French dessert shop Sashing Sweets, “power-up” chants by the staff, and also get their photo taken with their favourite cafe staff. For its first year, it was highly successful, having attracted over 300 orders via preorder and walk-in.

 Cosplay Photography Exhibition: Local photographer Tan Ching Yee visited, interviewed and photographed more than 20 cosplayers in their homes and put together a unique exhibition featuring portraits of cosplayers that reveal hints of their private lives.
 Ball-jointed doll Display Booth: An exhibition booth put together by the local doll collector community, they created a Japanese Garden Theme Doll display booth called "Sakura Blossom of the Spring” with beautiful backdrops, detailed props, and dolls in traditional Japanese clothing.
 Lolita Fashion Runway: A runway made up of and designed by girls the Lolita community in Singapore, showcasing Lolita clothing as worn in Singapore.
 Cosplay Contest : In 2013, Singapore Press Holdings held an online cosplay photo submission contest. Judging is done via public voting and by a panel of judges and the prizes were presented on stage at EOY Cosplay Festival 2013.

Performances 

 Yui Makino (2009)
Yui gave two concerts; a 15-minute-long mini concert and a full-length 45-minute-long concert. Songs performed included  "Fuwa Fuwa", "Amrita" and theme songs from Tsubasa Chronicle and Aria. She also held two autograph sessions and a Q-and-A session with the audience. Prior to her appearance, she made a special comment video.

 DANCEROID (2010), comprising
 Aikawa Kozue
 Ikura
Aikawa Kozue and Ikura (also known as Itokutora) gave two dancicals. They performed duets to "Luka Luka ★ Night Fever", "FirstKiss!","Gravity=Reality", "Megu Megu ☆ Fire Endless Night", "Lily Lily ★ Burning Night" and "LOL -lots of laugh-". Ikura and Aikawa Kozue each performed a solo dance to "Strobe Night" and "Teach me!! The Lyrics of Magic" respectively. They also did a mass dance with the audience to "Luka Luka ★ Night Fever", where some members of the audience were allowed to join them on stage. An autograph session and a Q-and-A session with the audience were held.

 Hitomi from @home Cafe (2011)

Apart from serving food in a very 'moe' way, drawing cute pictures on dishes and casting magical spells on food, Hitomi also delivers singing and dancing performances regularly at @home Cafe. She also performed a 45-minute-long song and dance performance at EOY 2011, and served lunch to the VIP ticket holders.

 Wata わた　(2013)
Wata performed 2 sets of dances at the EOY Coslay Festival 2013 spanning over an approximate time of 40minutes, and a flashmob with a group of local dancers. She also held a meet-and-greet-session, where merchandise including T-shirts, towels, wristbands and phone straps were on sale.

Sponsorship 
To cope with the costs of funding the event, the organising team seeks out sponsors and partners to provide financial and in-kind support. These sponsors and partners include Singapore Press Holdings, Wacom, OCBC, Bunka Language Pte. School, Pan-In-The-Box, Brigitte Cosmetics, ACS Comics, Toy Coin, Happy Ice Pte Ltd, BonJapan, Youth.SG, Sapporo Beer Singapore, Orchard Hotel Singapore, PAssion Card, Coca-Cola Singapore, Pink Blue Photography, Platiper Software, Sashing Sweets, Baby the Stars Shine Bright  and Shiseido.

References

External links 
 EOY Official Website
 EOY Official Facebook Page
 EOY Official Youtube Channel

Fan conventions
Anime conventions in Singapore